Marshall Hawkins (born July 14, 1939) is a jazz musician and teacher. He grew up in Washington DC.

He is possibly best known for being one of several bassists who took over from Ron Carter when the latter left Miles Davis' so-called Second Great Quintet. Hawkins played with Miles Davis, along with Herbie Hancock and drummer Tony Williams. More recently, Hawkins has been part of the West Coast version of the Harry Pickens Trio, featuring  Louisville jazz pianist, with Harold Mason on drums.

Hawkins later taught at the Idyllwild School of Music and the Arts (ISOMATA), now Idyllwild Arts Academy, and currently is head of the Jazz Program.

On February 5, 2022, Hawkins received an honorary doctorate of music performance from a California Baptist University.

Discography
1965: Travelin' Light – Shirley Horn
1970: Chapter Two – Roberta Flack
1970: Everything Is Everything – Donny Hathaway
1976: Starburst - Reuben Brown Trio Featuring Richie Cole
1979: Hollywood Madness - Richie Cole
1985: Vocalese – The Manhattan Transfer
1987: Popbob - Richie Cole
1998: Richie & Phil & Richie - Richie Cole

References

External links
 Marshall Hawkins Interview NAMM Oral History Library (2019)

African-American jazz musicians
American jazz double-bassists
Male double-bassists
Miles Davis
1939 births
Living people
21st-century double-bassists
American male jazz musicians